Lumino is a hip-hop group from Mongolia founded in 1996. Their music is dance-friendly and often melodic, with frequent contributions by external vocalists. Like most Mongolian bands, they like to include elements of traditional Mongolian music in their songs.

The creation of the band was inspired by a person named Jason who worked as an English teacher in Mongolia in 1996 and 1997. Besides giving language lessons, he also introduced his students to hip-Hop music. Five of them then came together to form Lumino, but a few years after the formation of the band two of their members, Chinzo and Hülgüü, stopped performing with the band. At one point Lumino consisted of more than a dozen members, headed by Skitzo, including the main MCs Skitzo, MC, Chinzo, and Lizard and MCs from the groups Old School and Skitzo's Free Style.

Around 1999 the group went through a major restructuring and changed their strategy in terms of songs they were producing. They also cut their members to five. Previously known for their hardcore rap, Lumino also started to make softer songs for mainstream audiences, and the head of the band was replaced by MC. A number of songs such as  Zam and Hüniih were made into video clips and repeatedly played on TV, while the video for Namaig dagaad tseng was censored because of its too explicit imagery.

Discography 
  (End garch irev, 2001)
  (Ireed butssan khair mini, 2002)
  (Gerelt khorvood, 2003)
  (Lamba guain nulims, 2005)
  (Khuuchin surguuli "Old school", 2007)

Members 
 D. Temujin (MC) (The General of Mongolian HipHop)
 B. Bat-Khishig (Baji)
 D. Ankhbaatar (Skitzo) (a.k.a. CUTHBERTH)
 T. Zolbayar (Dj Zolo)

Video

 2000  “Бүтэлгүй хайр” Zaya’sh 
 2000  “Баярлалаа,Ухаарлаа” Zaya’sh
 2001  “Энд гарч ирэв” Оны шилдэг клип Zaya’sh
 2002  “Зам” Zaya’sh
 2003  “Ирээд буцсан хайр минь” Zaya’sh
 2003  “Хэдэн үгс” Lemon production 
 2003  “Наддаа ирээч” Zaya’sh
 2003  “Намайг дагаад цэнгэ!” Lemon production
 2003  “Гэрэлт хорвоод” Zaya’sh
 2004  “Эхнэртээ бичсэн захидал” Zaya’sh
 2004  “Хүнийх” Zaya’sh
 2004  “Хип хоп рыцаръ” Lemon production
 2004  “2 дахь хайр” Hero entertainment
 2004  “Хүслийн шөнө” Lu entertainment
 2005  “Freestyle” Lemon production
 2005  “Кармааны хулгайч” Hero entertainment
 2005  “Хайртай гэдгээ хэлээч” Cross studio
 2006  “Өвөл” G entertainment
 2006  “Тайван” Skin entertainment
 2006  “Надтай цуг баяс” Lu entertainment
 2006  “Уучил намайг” Zaya’sh
 2007  “7 эгшиг” Lu entertainment
 2007  “Бүжээрэй!” Lu entertainment
 2007  “Минийх” Lu entertainment
 2010  “Талархалын өдөр” TJ entertainment

Sources 
 

Mongolian musical groups
Hip hop groups
Musical groups established in 1996